The Two Sisters (Italian: Le due sorelle) is a 1950 Italian melodrama film directed by Mario Volpe and starring Vera Carmi, Enzo Fiermonte and Checco Durante.

The film's sets were designed by the art director Ivo Battelli. It was made at the Palatino Studios while location shooting took place around Matera in Basilicata.

Cast
Vera Carmi	as Franca
Enzo Fiermonte as Barone Enrico
Checco Durante as Fattore Cosimo
Jone Paoli as Almina
Fedele Gentile as Antonio
Sandro Ruffini as Padre Giovanni
Mara Landi	as Gilda
Anita Durante as Agata
Gina Amendola as Chiarina
Luigi Erminio D'Olivo as Decio
Amedeo Girardi as Il Dottore
Lora Silvani as Agnesina
Roberto Spiombi as Nicola
Ugo Urbino	as Cecè

References

Bibliography
 Chiti, Roberto & Poppi, Roberto. Dizionario del cinema italiano: Dal 1945 al 1959. Gremese Editore, 1991.

External links
 

1950 films
1950s Italian-language films
Films shot in Matera
1950 drama films
Italian drama films
Films directed by Mario Volpe
Melodrama films
Italian black-and-white films
Films shot at Palatino Studios
1950s Italian films